The Protector Palm Pistol is a small revolver designed to be concealed in the palm of the hand. It was unique in that the revolver was clasped in a fist with the barrel protruding between two fingers and the entire handgun was squeezed in order to fire a round. The design was meant to resemble a pocket watch to the extent of being carried on a chain.

History
The Protector Palm Pistol was first patented and built in France in 1882 by Jacques Turbiaux and sold as the "Turbiaux Le Protector" or the "Turbiaux Disc Pistol". Later in 1883 it was built in the USA as The Protector by Minneapolis Firearms Co.. Peter H. Finnegan of Austin, Illinois bought the patent in 1892 and founded  the Chicago Fire Arms Co. to make and market the pistols. In anticipation of the World's Columbian Exposition in 1893, he contracted the Ames Sword Company of Chicopee, Massachusetts to manufacture 15,000 pistols. Ames made 1,500 of the pistols by the deadline of the exhibition. Finnegan sued for damages and engaged in a lawsuit with Ames. The company countersued and settled with Finnegan, but, through the years, had amassed a large production run of 12,800 pistols. The company sold the inventory and abandoned the design by 1910.

Remington manufactured the rimfire ammunition for this pistol, 32 Extra Short and alternatively 32 Protector, until 1920.

Most Protectors were nickel-plated to prevent corrosion from being carried in close contact with the owner. These guns were shipped with hard rubber inserts for additional protection. Some varieties came with pearl inlays and a small percentage were blued.

Operation

The design of these pistols was based on that patented by Jacques E. Turbiaux of Paris.  Turbiaux described his pistol as "A revolver which may be held in the hand with no part exposed except the barrel". The protector was designed to be the size of a pocketwatch and is a unique pistol in that it is not fired using a conventional trigger, but by the operator squeezing his or her fist when the pistol is in the hand.

The guns were made in at least 3 different calibres. 6.35mm, 8mm and .41 inches. The european and US versions used different designs of safety catches with the European pistols having two different versions of  their sliding bar safety.

References

External links
Minneapolis Protector Palm Pistol
Protector Pistol
(Weapon No 259) Pistol .32 inch (Centre Fire) 'Le Protector'
Chicago Firearms "Protector" Palm Pistol
LE PROTECTOR SYSTEME E. TURBIAUX

Revolvers of France